The Brazil women's national under-20 volleyball team represents Brazil in international women's volleyball competitions and friendly matches under the age 20 and it is ruled by the Brazilian Volleyball Federation that is a member of South American volleyball body Confederación Sudamericana de Voleibol (CSV) and the international volleyball body government the Fédération Internationale de Volleyball (FIVB).

Results

U20 World Championship 

 Champions   Runners up   Third place   Fourth place

U19 South America Championship
 Champions   Runners up   Third place   Fourth place

Team

Current squad
The following is the Brazilian roster in the 2019 FIVB Volleyball Women's U20 World Championship.

Head coach: Cabral de Oliveira

Former squads

U20 World Championship
1997 – 9th place
Karine Guerra, Elisângela Oliveira, Jaline Prado de Oliveira, Erika Coimbra, Raquel Silva, Renata Schmutz, Flavia Assis, Lígia Centeno, Marina Daloca, Renata Carvalho, Vanessa Paterlini and Walewska Oliveira
1999 –  Silver medal
Cintia Leto, Fernanda Ferreira, Luciana Nascimento, Ana Paula Ferreira, Cibele Barboza, Erika Coimbra, Paula Pequeno, Thais Barbosa, Caroline Gattaz, Daniela Vieira, Ednéia Anjos and Ana Paula Larroza
2001 –  Gold medal
Juliana Costa, Paula Barros,  Fabíola de Souza, Paula Pequeno, Ana Cristina Porto, Cecília Menezes, Veridiana Fonseca, Welissa Gonzaga, Juliana Saracuza, Jaqueline Carvalho, Andréia Laurence and Sheilla Castro
2003 –  Gold medal
Fernanda Gritzbach (c), Danielle Lins,  Camila Adao, Thaisa Menezes, Fabiana Claudino, Fernanda Alves, Mari Mendes, Alessandra Sperb, Dayse Figueiredo, Joyce Silva, Joyce Victalino and Elymara Silva
2005 –  Gold medal
Regiane Bidias, Veronica Brito, Adenizia da Silva, Thaisa Menezes, Natalia Manfrin, Camila Torquette, Fernanda Rodrigues, Natasha Farinea, Michelle Pavao, Ana Tiemi Takagui (c), Suelen Pinto and Suelle Oliveira
2007 –  Gold medal
Erica Adachi, Camila Brait, Camila Monteiro, Betina Schmidt (c), Silvana Papini, Priscila Daroit, Natalia Pereira, Amanda Francisco, Reneta Maggioni, Maria Silva, Tandara Caixeta and Ingrid Felix
2009 –  Bronze medal
Thays Oliveira, Leticia Hage, Mara Leão, Natiele Gonçalves, Leticia Raymundi (c), Ana Beatriz Correa, Isadora Rodrigues, Roberta Ratzke, Leticia Pontes, Nathalia Daneliczin, Diana Silva and Glauciela Silva
2011 –  Silver medal
Sthefanie Paulino, Francynne Jacintho, Juliana Carrijo, Carolina Freitas, Isabela Paquiardi, Ana Beatriz Correa, Samara Almeida, Priscila Heldes (c), Gabriella Souza, Marjorie Correa, Sonaly Sidrão and Thais Saraiva
2013 –  Bronze medal
Naiane Rios, Maira Claro, Saraelen Lima, Gabriela Guimarães, Rosamaria Montibeller (c), Giovana Gasparini, Valquiria Dullius, Paula Mohr, Milka Silva, Domingas Araujo, Sara Silva and Daniela Guimarães
2015 –  Silver medal
Drussyla Costa, Lana Conceição (c), Ariane Pinto, Laiza Ferreira, Gabriela Candido, Gabriela Silva, Karoline Tormena, Lorenne Teixeira, Thais Oliveira, Lais Vasques, Lyara Medeiros and Maiara Basso
2017 – 5th place
Diana Alecrim, Lorena Viezel, Glayce Vasconcelos, Nyeme Costa, Amanda Sehn, Karyna Malachias, Karina Souza, Jackeline Santos (c), Júlia Bergmann, Tainara Santos, Lorrayna da Silva and Júlia Moura
2019 – 6th place
Rosely Nogueira, Laura Kudiess, Julia Kudiess, Julia Bergmann, Daniela Seibt, Jheovana Sebastião, Kisy Nascimento, Tainara Santos (c), Mayara Silva, Kenya Malachias, Ana Cristina de Souza and Leticia Moura

See also
 Brazil men's national under-21 volleyball team
 Brazil women's national volleyball team
 Brazil women's national under-23 volleyball team
 Brazil women's national under-18 volleyball team

References

External links
 Official website 

National women's under-20 volleyball teams
Volleyball in Brazil
Volleyball